The Oława (German: Ohle) is a left-bank tributary of the Oder River, 99.01 km long with a catchment area of 1167.4 km2.

Source
The river starts at an altitude of approximately 315 m above sea level in the Sudety Foreland above Lipniki in the Kamiennik Gmina. Apart from the source section, it flows through urbanized and industrialized areas. It flows through Ziębice, Strzelin, Wiązów, Oława, Siechnice and Wrocław, where it joins the Oder at 250.4 km of its course.

The hydrography of the Olawa River is quite well developed. The river has no major tributaries except Krynka and Gnojna. The Oława is of particular importance in the provincial monitoring network due to the fact that it supplies water to Wrocław. In the lower section (mainly below the mouth of the Psarski Channel) the river is used for canoeing.

References

See also 
 List of rivers of Germany
 List of rivers of Poland

Tributaries of the Oder
Rivers of Lower Silesian Voivodeship
Rivers of Opole Voivodeship
Geography of Wrocław